Arethusa bulbosa, commonly called dragon's mouth orchid, is the only species in the orchid genus Arethusa. The genus is named after a naiad of Greek mythology. This monotypic genus is abbreviated Aret in trade journals.

This terrestrial and rare orchid occurs in Eastern North America from Manitoba east to Newfoundland and St. Pierre & Miquelon south to Virginia, with isolated populations in northern Saskatchewan and in the Carolinas. It occurs in bogs, swamps and other wet lowlands.  It grows to a height of 15 cm. It forms a large, single, pink terminal flower, with a showy lip and white and yellow fringed crests.

Gallery

References

External links 
 
Wildflowers of Connecticut, Connecticut Botanical Society
Minnesota Wildflowers
Izel, Native Plants for Your Garden
Lady Bird Johnson Wildflower Center, University of Texas

Arethusinae
Orchids of Canada
Orchids of the United States
Flora of Eastern Canada
Flora of the Northeastern United States
Flora of the Southeastern United States
Plants described in 1753